German classification may refer to:

 German wine classification
 UIC classification of locomotive axle arrangements, German axle classification of locomotives